Scarlet is a 2013 young adult science fiction novel written by American author Marissa Meyer and published by Macmillan Publishers through their subsidiary Feiwel & Friends. It is the second novel in The Lunar Chronicles series and the sequel to Cinder. The story is loosely based on the fairy tale of "Little Red Riding Hood", similar to Cinder, which was loosely based on "Cinderella".

Plot
Scarlet Benoit is a young girl living on her grandmother's farm in Rieux, France. Her grandmother has gone missing for many weeks and Scarlet is sure that she has been kidnapped rather than left on her own will as the authorities believe. While delivering fresh goods to one of her loyal but unfriendly customers, her friend Émilie introduces her to a jittery shy street fighter whose code name is Wolf, who saves her after she makes a speech defending Linh Cinder, the Lunar cyborg who caused chaos at the Eastern Commonwealth ball. She notices a tattoo on his arm; a string of numbers and letters that have no meaning to her. When she gets back from her job, her estranged dad is there and is desperately trying to find something. She questions her dad, who has burn marks all up his arms from being tortured, and he says that the same people have her grandmother because she is hiding something. The one clue that he can remember is that the kidnappers had a tattoo on their forearm, similar to Wolf's. Scarlet heads out to question Wolf in a fight ring, where he defeats and almost kills the champion. The next morning Wolf comes by her farm and tells her that the tattoo stands for a group he used to be part of and that they are the ones who kidnapped her grandma. He decides to help Scarlet and they both embark on a trip to Paris.

On the train to Paris, Scarlet meets a man called Ran, who Wolf seems to smell on her later. They jump off the train after a letumosis outbreak occurs and continue their journey through the woods. While resting, Ran shows up and Scarlet realizes that he and Wolf already know each other and don't get along well, and Ran is eventually revealed to be Wolf's younger brother. Wolf fights with Ran and almost kills him until Scarlet shoots him in the arm. They leave Ran unconscious and get on another train to Paris, and Scarlet learns that her father has died. Throughout this time, Wolf and Scarlet start to develop romantic feelings for each other.

Meanwhile, Cinder teams up with captain Carswell Thorne, a fellow prisoner who stole a spaceship from the American Republic military, and they escape from the New Beijing prison. Cinder passes out while trying to start Thorne's stolen ship up, and Thorne has to reboot her. They escape on the ship, a Rampion, but find problems with the autopilot. Cinder remembers that she has Iko's personality chip and inserts it. Once in space, Thorne asks Cinder where she wants to go and even though Dr. Erland told her to go to Africa, she chooses to go look for Michelle Benoit, a woman connected to the missing Lunar Princess Selene (Cinder) and Scarlet's grandmother.

When Scarlet and Wolf arrive in Paris, he leads her to where her grandmother is being held, but turns her in and reveals that he is a Lunar Special Operative, a bioengineered wolf-Lunar hybrid soldier who serves Queen Levana. Glamouring himself as her grandmother, Ran manipulates Scarlet into telling everything she knows about Princess Selene and why her grandma can't be manipulated. She recalls Linh Garan, the man who adopted Cinder after her surgery, talking to her grandmother but doesn't know why she resists manipulation. Then, she is imprisoned.

At the same time, Cinder and Thorne land in Rieux and discover Michelle Benoit's shelter, where Cinder was held in a suspension tank for eight years and later turned into a cyborg. They go to Gilles's tavern but are found by the military after tracking her dead stepsister's ID chip, which Cinder still had with her. Trouble gets worse when the Lunar wolf soldiers start attacking, following Queen Levana's order. Barely escaping, Cinder tracks down Scarlet.

Wolf visits Scarlet in her cell and kisses her in order to give her an ID chip, which she uses to escape and go to her grandmother's cell. Michelle Benoit tells Scarlet that Cinder is Princess Selene and that she must find her. Her grandmother also tells her that Scarlet is the granddaughter of Logan Tanner, the doctor who spirited Selene to Earth and performed her cyborg surgery, and eventually killed himself after suffering many years of Lunar sickness. Ran comes in and threatens her but her grandmother sacrifices herself to allow her to run away. However, after killing Michelle, Ran chases down Scarlet until Wolf appears and starts fighting with him, eventually killing him. Wolf then corners Scarlet and struggles with his thaumaturge's control, but is shot with a tranquilizer dart by Cinder, who thought he was harming Scarlet. Scarlet and Wolf reconcile, Wolf reasoning out that he was able to overpower his wolf killing instinct due to his overwhelming animal-like instinct to protect his mate, and Scarlet agrees to be his "alpha female". They all manage to escape in the Rampion with Cinder finally revealing to Thorne and Iko that she is Princess Selene.

Finally, Emperor Kai agrees to marry Queen Levana in order to stop the attacks against Earth.

Characters
Scarlet Benoit: A red headed and curly haired farmer at Benoit Farms and Gardens. She wants to find her grandmother, who is missing. She is eventually revealed to be part Lunar, as she is the granddaughter of Logan Tanner, the Lunar doctor who performed Cinder's cyborg surgery. She is based on Little Red Riding Hood.
Ze'ev "Wolf" Kesley: A street fighter who once belonged to a "Pack", willing to help Scarlet find her missing grandmother. It is later revealed that he is a runaway genetically-modified Lunar special operative named Ze'ev Kesley and alpha of a "pack", a cell of genetically-modified Lunar special operatives. He falls in love with Scarlet, allowing him to fight free from Lunar control.
Michelle Benoit: Scarlet’s grandmother who has gone missing, possibly taken hostage by “the Pack” for information she may have from when she was a pilot for the European Air Force. During her time in the Air Force, she was part of a diplomatic Earthen team sent to Luna, and during her time there, she met and fell in love with Logan Tanner, a Lunar doctor.
Luc Benoit: Scarlet's charismatic and selfish alcoholic father.
Ran Kesley: the omega of the "Pack" that Wolf was once a part of. Ran Kesley is Wolf's younger brother.
Linh Cinder: A young female cyborg mechanic and main protagonist in The Lunar Chronicles. Revealed as the Lunar Princess Selene in Cinder, who is the missing heir to the throne of Luna and niece of Queen Levana.
Emperor Kaito: Known as Kai, the Crown Prince of Eastern Commonwealth, has become emperor after his father died in the plague.
Dr. Erland: Lunar fugitive that took care of Cinder in the first book after spending many years looking for her.
Iko: Cinder's android partner and one of her only friends. Iko sometimes forgets that she's not human due to her malfunctioning personality chip. She is forcibly dismantled by Adri after Cinder is arrested, but luckily her chip survived and Cinder vowed to give her a new life, which she does in Thorne’s space ship.
Carswell Thorne: A runaway cadet from the American Republic Military, but referred to as Captain. He is a fugitive that escapes with Cinder from New Beijing prison after being convicted and sentenced to a 6-year prison sentence.
Queen Levana: The cruel queen of Luna, the moon colony. Not above using terrorist and genocidal tactics to obtain power, she is partially responsible for the existence of the plague on Earth since many of her subjects flee there to escape her influence. She uses a powerful glamour to appear captivatingly beautiful and force people to do her bidding.

References

External links

The Lunar Chronicles Website

2013 American novels
Sequel novels
Novels set in France
Feiwel & Friends books
Novels set in prison
Novels about androids
Cyborgs in literature
Dystopian novels
2013 science fiction novels
Novels based on fairy tales
Works based on Little Red Riding Hood
Novels by Marissa Meyer